The 2008 National Camogie League is a competition in the women's team field sport of camogie was won by Kilkenny, who defeated Galway in the final, played at Nowlan Park, Kilkenny.

Arrangements
Kilkenny were attempting to win to the League title for the first time since 1993, and on home soil, there was pressure on them to achieve that feat. Kilkenny had defeated then All-Ireland champions Wexford, 2-11 to 1-11, before travelling to Cork to overcome the rebels 0-8 to 1-4 on a wind- swept blustery day to qualify for a league final.

Final
In the league final, Galway led 0-11 to 1-5 at the interval, with an Aoife Neary goal late in the first-half giving Kilkenny hope.
Further second-half from Michelle Quilty and substitute Edwina Keane gave Kilkenny victory with Sinead Millea member of the 1993 National league winning campaign top scorer with 0-5 all from frees.

Aoife Neary was named player of the match.

Division 2
The Division 2 final, known until 2005 as the National Junior League, was won by Clare who defeated Derry in the final. The Division 3 final was won by Antrim who defeated Offaly in the final.

Final stages

References

2008
National Camogie League, 2008